The SNCF Class A1AA1A 68500 is a class of 28 mixed traffic diesel locomotives originally intended for operating main line freight services on the Paris – Chalindrey – Belfort route. They are similar to the Class A1AA1A 68000 but with an AGO engine rather than the Sulzer fitted to the latter. 5 members of the class were rebuilt as A1AA1A 68000 by replacing the AGO prime mover with Sulzer engines, thought to be those formerly used in the BR Class 48 locomotives, D1702–1706. Subsequently, 13 members of the class 68000 were rebuilt as 68500 in 1993. The last was withdrawn from traffic in July 2011.

References

68500
A1A-A1A locomotives
A1AA1A 680500
Standard gauge locomotives of France